Justo José de Urquiza y García (October 18, 1801 – April 11, 1870) was an Argentine general and politician who served as president of the Argentine Confederation from 1854 to 1860.

Life
Justo José de Urquiza y García was born in Entre Ríos, the son of José Narciso de Urquiza Álzaga, born in Castro Urdiales, Spain, and María Cándida García González, a Creole of Buenos Aires. He was governor of Entre Ríos during the government of Juan Manuel de Rosas, governor of Buenos Aires with powers delegated from the other provinces. Rosas presented a resignation to his charge frequently, but only as a political gesture, counting that the other governments would reject it. However, in 1851, resentful of the economic and political dominance of Buenos Aires, Urquiza accepted Rosas' resignation and resumed for Entre Rios the powers delegated in Buenos Aires. Along with the resuming of international commerce without passing through the port of Buenos Aires, Urquiza replaced the "Death to the savage unitarians!" slogan with "Death to the enemies of national organization!", requesting the making of a national constitution that Rosas had long rejected. Corrientes supported Urquiza's action, but Rosas and the other provinces condemned the "crazy, traitor, savage, unitarian" Urquiza. Supported by Brazil and the Uruguayan liberals, he created the Grand Army and forced Manuel Oribe to capitulate, ending the long siege of Montevideo in October 1851, and finally defeating Rosas on 3 February 1852 at the Battle of Caseros. The other provinces that supported Rosas against Urquiza's pronunciation changed sides and supported his project of creating a National Constitution.

Urquiza immediately began the task of national organization. He became provisional director of the Argentine Confederation in May 1852. In 1853, a constituent assembly adopted a constitution based primarily on the ideas of Juan Bautista Alberdi, and Urquiza was inaugurated president in March 1854.

During his administration, foreign relations were improved, public education was encouraged, colonization was promoted, and plans for railroad construction was initiated. His work of national organization was, however, hindered by the opposition of Buenos Aires, which seceded from the Confederation. Open war broke out in 1859. Urquiza defeated the provincial army led by Bartolomé Mitre in October 1859, at the Battle of Cepeda, and Buenos Aires agreed to re-enter the Confederation.

Constitutional amendments proposed by Buenos Aires were adopted in 1860 but the settlement was short-lived, and further difficulties culminated in civil war. Urquiza met the army of Buenos Aires, again led by Mitre, in September 1861. The battle was indecisive, but Urquiza withdrew from the field, leaving the victory with Mitre. He retired to San José Palace, his residence in Entre Ríos, where he ruled until he was assassinated at age 69 (along with his sons Justo and Waldino) by followers of dissident and political rival Ricardo López Jordán.

Like many other nineteenth century Argentine patriots, Urquiza was a freemason.  His imposing Palacio San José has been interpreted as containing many masonic symbols, created "to symbolize and reflect the construction of his other work: the Argentine State".

Tributes
There are many streets, parks and squares all over Argentina that are named after Justo José de Urquiza, such as the Urquiza park in Rosario or the Urquiza park in Parana City. There is a central street in Rosario called Urquiza, and there is a commuter railway line in Buenos Aires named after him, the Urquiza Line. The Colegio del Uruguay, founded by Urquiza, was later renamed in his honor.

References 

1801 births
1870 deaths
People from Entre Ríos Province
Argentine people of Basque descent
Federales (Argentina)
Argentine generals
Presidents of Argentina
People murdered in Argentina
Assassinated Argentine politicians
Deaths by firearm in Argentina
 Argentine Freemasons